The Wu River is a right tributary of the Yuan River in southwestern Hunan Province, south China. It rises in the southern Chengbu Miao Autonomous County. The river runs northward joins Yuan River at Guihuayuan, Hongjiang City.

Notes

Rivers of Hunan